Roberto Jáuregui was an Argentine journalist, actor, and human rights activist. Jáuregui was among the first people to contract HIV in Argentina, and the first to publicly disclose his condition. He was also the first General Coordinator of the Fundación Huésped, an Argentinian public health organization which has prioritized HIV/AIDS awareness and treatment. His brother, Carlos Jáuregui, was also an activist for LGBT rights and related issues.

Notable events 
In 1989, Jáuregui had contracted HIV, but did not have the money to pay for treatment. He publicly denounced the inequality of access to healthcare which he believed existed in Argentina at the time, bringing him into the public eye as an activist for public health and HIV/AIDS treatment.

He appeared on the television show Hora Clave in 1993, where reporter Mariano Grondona asked Jáuregui to give him a hug, publicly debunking the misconception that physical touch alone can transmit HIV. During the program, when asked by a doctor about whether he was afraid of death, he replied  ("And you, doctor, are you not afraid of death?")

Jáuregui also appeared on the telenovela Celeste to speak about living with HIV. This appearance was a result of UNICEF's strategy of using soap operas to educate about health issues.

On January 13, 1994, Jáuregui died of AIDS complications.

See also 

 Carlos Jáuregui (activist)
 HIV/AIDS in Argentina

References 

People from La Plata
Argentine LGBT rights activists
1960 births
1994 deaths
Argentine journalists
Male journalists
Argentine human rights activists
AIDS-related deaths in Argentina